Arturo is a Spanish and Italian variant of the name Arthur.

People
Arturo Álvarez (footballer, born 1985), American-born Salvadoran footballer
Arturo Álvarez (footballer, born 1959), Mexican footballer
Arthuro Henrique Bernhardt (b. 1982), Brazilian football (soccer) player
Arturo Brachetti (born 1957), Italian quick-change artist 
Arturo Bragaglia (1893–1962), Italian actor
Arturo Bravo (born 1958), Mexican racewalker
Arturo Casadevall (born 1957), American physician
Arturo Castro (Mexican actor) (1918–1975), Mexican actor
Arturo Castro (Guatemalan actor), Guatemalan actor
Arturo Corvalán (born 1978), Chilean road cyclist
Arturo De Vecchi (1898–1988), Italian fencer
Arturo Di Modica (1941–2021), Italian-born American artist
Arturo Di Napoli (born 1974), Italian soccer (UK: football) coach
Arturo Dominici (1918–1992), Italian actor and dubbing artist
Arturo Freeman, American football player
Arturo Frondizi (1908–1995), 35th President of Argentina
Arturo Gatti (1972–2009), Italian-Canadian boxer
Arturo Giovannitti (1884–1959), Italian-American union leader, socialist political activist, and poet
Arturo Godoy (1912–1986), Chilean boxer
Arturo Merzario (born 1943), Italian automobile racing driver
Arturo Benedetti Michelangeli (1920-1995), Italian virtuoso pianist
Arturo Paoli (1912–2015), Italian priest and missionary
Arturo Parisi (born 1940), Italian politician
Arturo Pérez-Reverte (born 1951), Spanish writer
Arturo Reggio, Italian chess player
Arturo Sandoval, Cuban jazz musician
Arturo Toscanini (1867–1957), Italian composer and conductor 
Arturo Vidal (born 1987), Chilean football (soccer) player

Fictional characters 
 Arturo Plateado from Bleach: Shattered Blade
 Arturo Binewski, known as Arturo the Aqua Boy, seal flippered cult leader from Katherine Dunn's Geek Love
 Arturo Bandini, an alter ego of John Fante in four semi-autobiographical novels
 Arturo Belano, an alter ego of the Chilean writer Roberto Bolaño
 Arturo Tronco from 91 Days.
 Arturo Román from Spanish show Le Casa De Papel, also known as Money Heist
 Lil' Arturo, a villain from the Gangreen Gang who appeared in the animated series The Powerpuff Girls
Maximillian Arturo from Sliders

Animals 
Arturo (polar bear), a polar bear who lived in an Argentinian zoo

Italian masculine given names
Spanish masculine given names

br:Arzhur
de:Arthur (Begriffsklärung)
fr:Arthur
he:ארתור
nl:Arthur
ja:アーサー
pl:Arthur
pt:Artur
sv:Artur#Personer med namnet Artur eller Arthur